Jong PSV is a Dutch football team based in Eindhoven. It is the reserve team of PSV Eindhoven and plays in the Eerste Divisie since the 2013–14 season.

History
Until 2013, Jong PSV played in the Beloften Eredivisie, a league exclusively for reserve teams. That year, the KNVB decided to expand the Eerste Divisie to 20 teams by adding two amateur teams and two reserve teams. Initially, Jong Ajax and Jong FC Twente were chosen, based on the team's interest and the Beloften Eredivisie league results. But after amateur team VV Katwijk rejected the offer, Jong PSV were offered the fourth and final league slot. Because Jong PSV have entered the same league system as PSV, the team has to adhere to certain rules. The team is ineligible for promotion, play-offs, relegation or the KNVB Cup; the maximum player age is 23 (minus three field players and one goalkeeper); and players with 150 or more appearances in PSV are ineligible for Jong PSV. Other rules for Eerste Divisie teams regarding accommodation and coaching licenses apply as well.

Jong PSV used to play their home matches in the Philips Stadion. When the Philips Stadion was unavailable, PSV used the Jan Louwers Stadion as alternative location. Originally, De Herdgang was considered as an option, but the Dutch Football Association rejected the idea. After adjustments were made, De Herdgang is now the official place where Jong PSV play their games.

Squad
As of 29 January 2023.

Club Officials

Honours
Beloften Eredivisie: (4)
1996–97, 1999–00, 2009–10, 2010–11
KNVB Beker voor beloften: (3)
2000–01, 2004–05, 2007–08
Supercup Beloften: (2)
2010, 2011

Cup matches

References

External links 
Official website PSV Youth Academy

PSV Eindhoven
Dutch reserve football teams
Premier League International Cup